Notiodes ovalis is a species of marsh weevil in the beetle family Brachyceridae.

References

Further reading

 
 

Brachyceridae
Articles created by Qbugbot
Beetles described in 1876